Lorraine Laporte-Landry (1942 – July 18, 1999) was an influential judge in the Quebec justice system.  She was married to former premier Bernard Landry with whom she had three children. She attended the Université de Montréal and HEC Montréal.

She was appointed a Quebec Court judge in March 1995. In the face of opposition claims that Bernard Landry's influence had gotten her the job, the government insisted that she had been chosen in the usual way by an independent selection committee.

She helped train judges in Quebec, Belgium, the Czech Republic and Slovakia.

References
Radio-Canada: Décès de Lorraine Laporte-Landry
ENAP: Lists a book chapter written by Lorraine Laporte-Landry
Obituary in Journal de Montréal

1942 births
1999 deaths
Judges in Quebec
Deaths from cancer in Quebec
Canadian women judges
Université de Montréal alumni
HEC Montréal alumni